Air Philip was a short-lived South Korean airline. It flew on domestic as well as international routes. The main office was in Muan County while the company governor (지사) was in Seoul. As of March 13, 2019, Air Philip ended all of its flights and ceased operation.

History
On November 28, 2018, the airline flew its first international flight, from Muan to Vladivostok. In February 2019, the airline suspended all international flights, whilst their remaining domestic operations ended in March 2019.

Destinations
As of February 2019, Air Philip flew to the following destinations:

Fleet
 
As of December 2018, Air Philip operated the following aircraft:

See also
 List of defunct airlines of South Korea
 Transport in South Korea

References

External links
 

Defunct airlines of South Korea
Airlines established in 2016
Airlines disestablished in 2019
South Korean companies established in 2016
2019 disestablishments in South Korea